Trams and trolleybuses in North Korea are forms of public transportation for North Koreans to travel around in urban centres given the shortages on fuel and access to cars for average citizens.

Very few details are known about these trolleybuses and trams due to the closed society of North Korea. Pyongyang, Wonsan and Chongjin are the only cities known to have tramways.

For a full list of trolleybus systems in North Korea, see List of trolleybus systems in North Korea.

Trams

Trolleybuses
The Pyongyang trolleybus system has been operating since 1962, with a large fleet serving several routes. Due to the closed nature of North Korea, the existence of trolleybus networks in other North Korean cities was generally unknown outside the country for many years, but it is now known that around 12 to 15 other cities also possess trolleybus systems, among them Sariwon, Wonsan, Chongjin and Pyongsong. A few other places have very small (in some cases only one or two vehicles) systems for transporting workers from a housing area to a nearby coal mine or other industrial site—or at least did at some time within recent years, such as the city of Sangnong.  Trolleybuses include both imported and locally made vehicles but are mostly locally made, converted or rebuilt. There are a few local manufacturers of trolleybuses.

In 2020, NK News speculated that North Korea was likely to start a removal of its trolleybus systems; however, with the revival of the network in Wonsan during 2018–19, Sinuiju in 2020 and the opening of a new system in Manpo in 2019 directly contradicts this article, and most of currently not operating systems had its trolleybuses removed prior to 2011. It is also important to note, that according to The Pyongyang Times, new trolleybuses are still being constructed.

Pyongyang Trolleybus Factory

Chongjin Bus Factory

Others

See also

 Pyongyang Metro
 Pyongyang Tram
 Transport in North Korea
Trolleybus usage by country

Notes

References
The Pyongyang Metro: Trams

External links

Recording of KCTV 28 December 20:00 news showing new trolleybuses in Chongjin
Discussion on Chongnyonho

 
 
Tram
Korea, North